Ruth Dickey (née Dowman, 3 January 1930 – 14 September 2018) was a New Zealand long jumper and sprinter who won a bronze medal in the long jump at the 1950 British Empire Games.

Biography
Born on 3 January 1930 to Athol Frederick Dowman and Iris Muriel Dowman (née Kettle), Ruth Dowman showed early promise as a sprinter, beating Joan Hart in a 100 yards handicap race in December 1944. Later that season, in February 1945, Dowman won the 100 yards title at the Auckland provincial track championships, and finished third in the 75 yards. The following month, she competed at the New Zealand national athletics championships in Napier, finishing second in both the 75 yards and 100 yards sprints. Dowman went on to win five national athletics titles: the 75 yards in 1946, 1947, and 1948; and the 100 yards in 1946 and 1947.

She also competed in the women's 100 yards, being eliminated in the semi-finals. In the 660 yards relay, Dowman was in the New Zealand team alongside Lesley Rowe, Dorothea Parker and Shirley Hardman, but the quartet was disqualified after the baton was dropped and incorrectly retrieved at the final exchange.

In 1951, Dowman married Clifford Samuel Dickey. She died on 14 September 2018.

References

1930 births
2018 deaths
Athletes from Auckland
New Zealand female sprinters
New Zealand female long jumpers
Commonwealth Games bronze medallists for New Zealand
Athletes (track and field) at the 1950 British Empire Games
Commonwealth Games medallists in athletics
Medallists at the 1950 British Empire Games